The minus six was a form of exile imposed in the Soviet Union during the 1920s, which banned the subject from living in or visiting any of the union's six largest cities as well as border territories.

Cities Banned
Moscow
Petrograd
Kiev
Kharkov
Sverdlovsk
Tbilisi

References

Political repression in the Soviet Union
Penal system in the Soviet Union